Patterson Farmhouse is a historic home located at Delmar in Albany County, New York.  It was built around 1840 and is a two-story, side gabled frame dwelling two rooms deep with a kitchen wing.  The front entry is Greek Revival in style; surrounded by narrow sidelights and a rectangular line of transom lights above.

It was listed on the National Register of Historic Places in 1997.

References

Houses on the National Register of Historic Places in New York (state)
Greek Revival houses in New York (state)
Houses completed in 1840
Houses in Albany County, New York
National Register of Historic Places in Albany County, New York